Cary Smith may refer to:

 Archibald Cary Smith, naval architect and marine engineer.
 Cary Smith (ski mountaineer), American ski mountaineer
 Cary Smith (politician), Republican member of the Montana Legislature